Bishopton railway station serves the village of Bishopton in Renfrewshire, Scotland. It opened on 29 March 1841. The station is managed by ScotRail.

Services

Evenings see a halving of services to Gourock and a reduction to 3tph to Glasgow.

On Sundays there are two trains per hour to Glasgow Central and hourly services to both Wemyss Bay and Gourock. The rolling stock used is predominantly Class 318 EMUs, Class 320 EMUs, Class 380 EMUs and Class 385 EMUs.

ROF sidings
There was a standard gauge link from the ROF railway line to the Inverclyde line. The factory had transfer sidings connected to both the up and down lines. The ROF line which was never electrified ran on to the transfer sidings a few yards west from the Bishopton station. It crossed Ingleston Road via a gated level crossing entering the ROF site from the north. The link remained in-situ right up until closure of the factory but was little used after the early 1990s. The sidings were removed in 2011.

Accident
A passenger train from Glasgow to Greenock was leaving the station on the morning of 16 January 1855. A mineral train travelling on the other line in the opposite direction approached and as the trains passed each other, trucks at the rear of the mineral train left the rails. They fell on the up line as the passenger train was coming. This resulted in the passenger train stopping quickly. Nobody was killed, however twelve mineral wagons were damaged.

Sources

References

External links

Video footage and commentary on Bishopton railway station.

Railway stations in Renfrewshire
Former Caledonian Railway stations
Railway stations in Great Britain opened in 1841
SPT railway stations
Railway stations served by ScotRail